Bo Michael Tretow (born 20 August 1944 in Norrköping) is a Swedish record producer and audio engineer, musician and composer, best known for his work with the Swedish pop group ABBA (1970–1982), and with the musical Chess. Tretow experimented with different recording techniques, and played an essential part in creating the "ABBA sound". He has also composed several themes and jingles for Swedish national radio and television.

Discography

As an artist 
 Mikael & Michael (1966, with Mikael Ramel)
 Let's boogie (1976)
 Caramba (1981, with Ted Gärdestad)
 Michael B. Tretow (1982)
 Tomteland (1985)
 Den makalösa manicken (1986, under the pseudonym Professorn)
 Hystereo Hi-lites (1989)
 Trafik-Trolle (early 1990s)
 Greatest Hits (1999)

As producer 
 Lena Andersson: Det Bästa Som Finns (1977)
 ABBA: Gracias Por La Música (1980)
 ABBA: ABBA Live (1986)
 Big Money: Lost In Hollywood (1992)
 Big Money: Moonraker (1994)

As engineer 
 Björn Ulvaeus & Benny Andersson: Lycka (1970)
 Lena Andersson: Lena 15 (1971)
 Lena Andersson: Lena (1971)
 Ted Gärdestad: Undringar (1972)
 Lena Andersson: 12 Nya Visor (1972)
 Björn & Benny, Agnetha & Frida (ABBA): Ring Ring (1972–1973)
 Ted Gärdestad: Ted (1973)
 Svenne & Lotta: Oldies But Goodies (1973)
 ABBA (Björn & Benny, Agnetha & Frida): Waterloo (1974)
 Ted Gärdestad: Upptåg (1974)
 Svenne & Lotta: 2/Bang-A-Boomerang (1975, engineer and co-producer)
 ABBA: ABBA (1975)
 ABBA: Greatest Hits (1975–1976)
 Anni-Frid Lyngstad: Frida ensam (1975)
 ABBA: Arrival (1976)
 Ted Gärdestad: Franska Kort (1976, engineer and co-producer)
 Svenne & Lotta: Letters (1976, engineer and co-producer)
 ABBA: The Album (1977)
 ABBA: Voulez-Vous (1979)
 ABBA: Greatest Hits Vol. 2 (1979)
 ABBA: Super Trouper (1980)
 Ted Gärdestad: I'd Rather Write a Symphony (1980, engineer and co-producer)
 Agnetha & Linda: Nu Tändas Tusen Juleljus (1980/1981, engineer and co-producer)
 ABBA: The Visitors (1981)
 Ted Gärdestad: Stormvarning (1981, engineer and co-producer)
 ABBA: The Singles: The First Ten Years (1982)
 Agnetha Fältskog: Wrap Your Arms Around Me (1983)
 Various Artists: Original Cast Recording, Musical Chess (1984)
 Agnetha Fältskog: Eyes of a Woman (1985)
 Gemini: Gemini (1985)
 Agnetha & Christian: Kom följ med i vår karusell (1987, engineer and co-producer)
 Gemini: Geminism (1987)
 ABBA: ABBA Gold: Greatest Hits (1992)
 ABBA: More ABBA Gold: More ABBA Hits (1993)
 ABBA: Thank You For The Music (1994)

References 
 Michael B Tretow, article, Nationalencyklopedin, http://www.ne.se/michael-b-tretow

External links
 45 Singles at 45cat

1944 births
Living people
People from Norrköping
Swedish audio engineers
Swedish record producers